Koro Cercle  is an administrative subdivision of the Mopti Region of Mali. The administrative center is the town of Koro.

The cercle is divided into 16 communes:

Bamba
Barapiréli
Bondo
Diankabou
Dinangourou
Dioungani
Dougouténé I
Dougouténé II
Kassa
Koporo Pen
Koporokendié Nâ
Koro
Madougou
Pel Maoudé
Yoro
Youdiou

References

Cercles of Mali
Ségou Region